The 2023 ATP Tour Masters 1000 is the thirty-fourth edition of the ATP Masters Series. The champion of each Masters event is awarded a 1,000 rankings points.

Tournaments

Results

Tournament details

Indian Wells Open

Singles

Doubles

See also 
 ATP Tour Masters 1000
 ATP Tour
 2023 WTA 1000 tournaments
 WTA Tour

References

External links 
 Association of Tennis Professionals (ATP) official website
 International Tennis Federation (ITF) official website

ATP Tour Masters 1000